The Reun Ar C'Hrank Formation is a geologic formation in France. It preserves fossils dating back to the Devonian period.

See also

 List of fossiliferous stratigraphic units in France

References
 

Devonian France
Devonian southern paleotemperate deposits